Bhadarva (Bhadarwa) is a village in Savli Taluka in Vadodara District of Gujarat State, India. Bhadarva's pin code is 391780 and postal head office is Bhadarwa.

Geography
bhadarva the state of natvarsinh thakor saheb

Bhadarva  is located on the banks of the Mahi (Mahisagar) River. It is 27 km north of the district headquarters at Vadodara. 13 km from Savli, and 108 KM from the State capital Gandhinagar.

The nearest villages to Bhadarva are Poicha (kanoda) (4 KM), Poicha (raniya) (2 KM), Ranchhodpura (6 KM), Moksi (6 KM), Anjesar (6 KM).  Bhadarva is surrounded by Savli Taluka towards the east, Anklav Taluka towards the south, Vadodara Taluka towards the south and Umreth Taluka towards the north .

Bhadarva is on the border of the Vadodara District and Anand District. Anand is west of this place .

People
Gujarati is the local language.

In 1880, there were more than 3,000 people living in Bhadarva. By 1951, the population was below 5,000. In 2001, there were about 6,000 people living here.

As per 2011 census total no of households is 1253, total population is 5951, of which 3069 are male and 2882 are female.

Majority of village population belongs to Kshatriya community. Bhadarva is a beautiful village situated on the bank of river Mahisagar. Surrounded by ravines and forests, it was a princely state in the era of British rule.

Places of tourist attractions are: 
Darbar Gadh
Mahi rover
Ravines and forests
GR Bhagat High School
Chehar Mataji Temple
Gyatari Mata Temple

Transportation

Vasad Jn Rail Way Station (15 km by road), and Ranoli Rail Way Station (13 km by road) are the nearby railway stations to Bhadarva. The nearest major station is Vadodara Jn Railway Station, 22 km away.

Bhadarva is also connected to Savli (11 km) by road.

References

External links 
 Location map of Bhadarva Village 
 Mahi River Mahi River

Villages in Vadodara district